Christopher Judy (born May 24, 1978) is an American politician who has served in the Indiana House of Representatives from the 83rd district since 2014.

References

1978 births
Living people
Republican Party members of the Indiana House of Representatives
21st-century American politicians